Vecinos is a Mexican television series. It may also refer to:

 Vecinos (Colombian TV series)
 Ramón Vecinos (1958–2009), Spanish football player and manager
 Vecinos, Salamanca, Spain, a municipality

See also
 Vecino
 Vecino (surname)